The 2016 UCLA Bruins baseball team represents the University of California, Los Angeles in the 2016 NCAA Division I baseball season.  The Bruins compete in the Pac-12 Conference, and play their home games in Jackie Robinson Stadium.  John Savage is in his twelfth season as head coach.

Schedule

Rankings from Collegiate Baseball; parenthesis indicate tournament seedings.

Ranking movements

References

UCLA
UCLA Bruins baseball seasons
UCLA